Megaworld Lifestyle Malls is the retail and commercial arm of Megaworld Corporation, and is one of the largest mall developers in the Philippines. It was founded in 2009, following the success of Megaworld’s first mall development, Eastwood Mall, in Quezon City.

Megaworld Lifestyle Malls epitomizes the ‘Play’ component in Megaworld’s Live-Work-Play-Learn concept, with its lifestyle properties serving as the center and point of convergence of the company’s township communities.  It currently has 17 lifestyle malls, covering 710,000 square meters of floor space across Metro Manila, Luzon and Visayas region.

Widely recognized as the country’s pioneer of the lifestyle malls concept,  the Megaworld Lifestyle Malls brand is characterized by unique designs and themes per mall, which such as the China-themed Lucky Chinatown  and the Italianesque Venice Grand Canal 

Recently, Megaworld Lifestyle Malls launched new logo following the release of a modernized and more streamlined Megaworld corporate logo. The logo was unveiled in line with the company’s 30th anniversary and features colorful and customizable design elements to portray the company’s Mission and Vision of “making happiness a lifestyle”.

The redesigned logo press event also coincided with Megaworld Lifestyle Malls announcement of its plans to launch 8 new malls in the next three years. The company has earmarked P10 billion for the new malls, which will open  in Cebu, Bacolod, Davao, Boracay, Cavite, and Pampanga by year 2022. These new malls will add another 54,000 square meters of fresh retail space, bringing the company’s GFA to more than 1.15 million square meters by 2022.

Flagship malls

Full-scale Malls
Megaworld Lifestyle Malls currently has 9 full-scale malls in Metro Manila, Laguna and Iloilo City in the Visayas region.

Dining and Community Malls
Each community mall is a host to dining, shopping, wellness and convenience establishments to cater to the immediate community.

Upcoming Malls

References

External links
Megaworld Lifestyle Malls Official Website

Shopping center management firms
Real estate companies established in 2009
Retail companies established in 2009
Retail companies of the Philippines
Philippine companies established in 2009
Companies based in Quezon City